Cruel Intentions is a 1999 film, followed by two sequels.

Cruel Intentions may also refer to:
 
 Cruel Intentions (soundtrack), 1999
 Cruel Intentions (pilot), an unaired 2016 pilot intended as a sequel to the 1999 film
 Cruel Intentions (EP), by Tory Lanez, 2015
 "Cruel Intentions" (Simian Mobile Disco song), 2010
 "Cruel Intentions", a song by JMSN, 2016